Healthy, Wealthy and Dumb is a 1938 short subject directed by Del Lord starring American slapstick comedy team The Three Stooges (Moe Howard, Larry Fine and Curly Howard). It is the 31st entry in the series released by Columbia Pictures starring the comedians, who released 190 shorts for the studio between 1934 and 1959.

Plot
Curly wins $50,000 from writing a catchy jingle for a radio contest. The boys quickly spend their loot, and check in at the Hotel Costa Plente. Their suite is furnished with many expensive items which they systematically destroy. In the process, three gold diggers connive their way into the boys' room, under the guise that they are three rich widows looking to remarry. This works perfectly, as Curly quickly discovers that all the tax deductions reduce his winnings to a minuscule $4.85. The gentlemen hastily agree to marry the ladies, who soon find out the Stooges are broke and knock them unconscious with champagne bottles.

Production notes
The title Healthy, Wealthy and Dumb is a parody of Benjamin Franklin's proverb "early to bed, early to rise, makes a man healthy, wealthy and wise." It would be remade as 1952's A Missed Fortune, with minimal stock footage.

References

External links
 
 

1938 films
1938 comedy films
The Three Stooges films
American black-and-white films
Films directed by Del Lord
Columbia Pictures short films
American slapstick comedy films
1930s English-language films
1930s American films